The Perlfee rabbit is a rare breed originating in Germany
 They are only found in blueish-grey colour, with dark, light and medium shades accepted, medium is preferred, the belly and around the eyes should be lighter in colour.

It is a recognized breed by the British Rabbit Council but not the American Rabbit Breeders Association.

Behavior 
Perlfee rabbits are rather docile and friendly. They are lively rabbits who make excellent pets for the beginner.

See also

List of rabbit breeds

References

Rabbit breeds
Rabbit breeds originating in England